This is a list of the mammals native to the U.S. state of Georgia.

References

Georgia
Mammals